is the ninth studio album by Chara, which was released on March 19, 2003. It debuted at #17 on the Japanese Oricon album charts, and charted in the top 300 for 5 weeks. It eventually sold 47,000 copies.

The entire album was produced and written by Chara. It was her last original album release on Sony.

Track listing

Singles

Japan sales rankings

References
 	

Chara (singer) albums
2003 albums
Ambient pop albums